

Walter Lucht (26 February 1882 – 18 March 1949) was a German general in the Wehrmacht during World War II who held commands at division, corps and army levels. He was a recipient of the  Knight's Cross of the Iron Cross with Oak Leaves of Nazi Germany.

Awards and decorations
 Iron Cross (1914) 2nd Class (14 October 1914) & 1st Class (19 October 1915)

 Clasp to the Iron Cross (1939) 2nd Class (17 May 1940) & 1st Class (23 June 1940)
 German Cross in Gold on 12 March 1942 as Generalmajor and commander of 87. Infanterie-Division
 Knight's Cross of the Iron Cross with Oak Leaves
 Knight's Cross on 30 January 1943 as Generalmajor and commander of 336. Infanterie-Division
 691st Oak Leaves on 9 January 1945 as General der Artillerie and commander of LXVI. Armeekorps

References

Citations

Bibliography

 
 
 

1882 births
1949 deaths
Military personnel from Berlin
Generals of Artillery (Wehrmacht)
German Army personnel of World War I
Condor Legion personnel
Recipients of the clasp to the Iron Cross, 1st class
Recipients of the Gold German Cross
Recipients of the Knight's Cross of the Iron Cross with Oak Leaves
Commander's Crosses of the Order of Merit of the Republic of Hungary (military)
German prisoners of war in World War II held by the United States
Prussian Army personnel
Reichswehr personnel
People from the Province of Brandenburg
German Army generals of World War II